The Agung Rai Museum of Art (ARMA) is a museum located in Ubud on Bali, Indonesia.

Literature

See also 
List of museums and cultural institutions in Indonesia

External links 
 Museum website

Museums in Bali
Art museums and galleries in Indonesiapo

Ubud